Reginald Edgecombe (24 October 1885 – 23 April 1966) was a British gymnast. He competed in the men's team all-around event at the 1920 Summer Olympics.

References

1885 births
1966 deaths
British male artistic gymnasts
Olympic gymnasts of Great Britain
Gymnasts at the 1920 Summer Olympics
Sportspeople from Birmingham, West Midlands